Plasmodium jiangi is a parasite of the genus Plasmodium subgenus Novyella. As in all Plasmodium species, P. jiangi has both vertebrate and insect hosts. The vertebrate hosts for this parasite are birds.

Distribution 
This species occurs in China.

Hosts 
The only known host of this species is the red-whiskered bulbul (Pycnonotus jocosus).

References 
Islam, K., and R. N. Williams. 2000. Red-vented Bulbul (Pycnonotus cafer) and Red-whiskered Bulbul (Pycnonotus jocosus). In The Birds of North America, No. 520 (A. Poole and F. Gill, eds.). The Birds of North America, Inc., Philadelphia, PA.

jiangi
Parasites of birds